Samuel Suľa (born 12 April 2000) is a Slovak professional footballer who currently plays as a defender for ViOn Zlaté Moravce, on loan from Žilina.

Club career

MŠK Žilina
Suľa made his Fortuna Liga debut for Žilina against DAC Dunajská Streda on 5 May 2019. He came on as a replacement for Slovak international Jaroslav Mihalík three minutes before stoppage time. While Michal Škvarka managed to score in stoppage time, Žilina lost the home fixture 1-2.

References

External links
 MŠK Žilina official club profile 
 
 Futbalnet profile 
 

2000 births
Living people
Slovak footballers
Slovakia youth international footballers
Slovakia under-21 international footballers
Association football defenders
MŠK Žilina players
FC ViOn Zlaté Moravce players
2. Liga (Slovakia) players
Slovak Super Liga players